Kiltseva is a station of the Kryvyi Rih Metrotram. It opened on 2 May 1989, as the last station of the second stage, and is the southern terminus of the system.

The station is a standard tram reversal ring which contains a series of pavilions and covered platforms. However, due to the left-hand operation of the final three stations, the direction is clockwise, which means that passengers are let in and out onto the middle of the ring. The station located next to the intersection of the Nikopol Highway with the Sviatoheorhiivska Street, and is served by a number of urban transport routes, including a standard city tram. All of the stops are linked by a series of underground passages, between the Kiltseva platforms there is an underground vestibule situated inside the subway. 

From the very start, the station was built as a temporary stop, with plans for another extension to the south primarily to the railway station Kryvyi Rih-Zakhidny and then into the southwestern Inhuletsky Raion, but not before passing through the infamous Kryvorizhstal plant. Actually part of the track from Prospekt Metalurhiv, after leaving the tunnel passes on a 300-meter causeway over the sediment bowl of the latter plant. In total, this would raise the length of the system by 6.5 kilometers and make it the most important transport artery. The station contained a gate with the city tram network next to the station which was used for service needs, since 2012 station serves as a transfer point to the KNEU station of the metrotram's third route.

External links
 Mir Metro - Description and photos
Google maps - Satellite shot.

Kryvyi Rih Metrotram stations